Balsamorhiza incana  (hoary balsamroot) is a North American species of plants in the tribe Heliantheae of the family Asteraceae. It is native to the northwestern United States, in Idaho, Montana, Wyoming, Washington, and Oregon.

Balsamorhiza incana  is an herb up to 70 cm (28 inches) tall. It has yellow flower heads, usually borne one at a time, with both ray florets and disc florets. It grows in grassy and rocky sites, often in conifer forests.

References

incana
Plants described in 1840
Flora of the Northwestern United States
Flora without expected TNC conservation status